The 50th Anniversary Collection 1964 is the third Bob Dylan collection released by Sony Music to prevent the recordings from legally entering the public domain in Europe. Released on vinyl only in December 2014 only 1,000 copies of the nine-LP set were produced.

Track listing

References

External links
BobDylan.com – Bob Dylan's Official Website

2014 compilation albums
Bob Dylan compilation albums
Sony Music compilation albums
2014 live albums
Bob Dylan live albums
Sony Music live albums
Albums produced by John Hammond (producer)
Copyright extension compilation albums